British Rail reserved the TOPS Class 97 designation for departmental locomotives, which were used for special or engineering duties.  They were therefore of several different classes, lumped together for numbering purposes. Some locomotives were converted from redundant engines, whilst others were purpose built. In 2008, Network Rail once again used Class 97 for signalling test locomotives (Class 97/3).

Allocation of numbers
Class 97 numbers were allocated in one of three ways:
 Application of 97 prefix to pre-TOPS number – e.g. Western Region shunters PWM 650–654 became 97650–97654.
 TOPS class number replaced by 97 prefix – e.g. Former Class 47 locomotive 47472 became 97472.
 Allocation of number in a series commencing from 97x01, where x represented the engine power Type (1 to 5), '7' for ex-multiple unit conversions and '8' for diesel shunters.

Locomotive descriptions

97020
Built by Ruston & Hornsby in January 1957 with the serial number 408493, this 4wDM shunter was ordered specifically for departmental use by the Signalling & Telecommunications department of the Western region at Reading Signal Works. Delivered to the WR with the number 20 it was renumbered to 97020 in May 1980. However withdrawal came in April 1981 and it was scrapped on site in August 1982 by Cartwrights of Tipton. For refuelling, it had to go via the main line to the depot at Reading.

97201

This locomotive was a former Class 24 locomotive No.24061, which was taken over by the Railway Technical Centre, based at Derby, in 1975. It was initially numbered RDB 968007, and was given its Class 97 number in 1979. It was employed hauling various test-trains until retirement in 1988. It was painted in RTC's distinctive red/blue livery, and named "Experiment". After withdrawal it was preserved on the Midland Railway Centre having been to Vic Berrys at Leicester for Asbestos Removal then later the East Lancs Railway before a spell at the North Tyneside Steam Railway before later moving to the North Yorkshire Moors Railway.

97202
This was former Class 25 locomotive 25131 used for training purposes at Toton depot. It had been withdrawn on 6 December 1982 and was reinstated as 97202 on 1 October 1983. It only lasted in Departmental service until January 1984 when it was again withdrawn, eventually being scrapped by Vic Berry.

Subsequently, other training locomotives were numbered in the ADB 968xxx series.

97203–97204

These locomotives were converted from Class 31 locomotives. The first, no. 97203, was operated by the Railway Technical Centre, based at Derby. It was used to haul various test-trains operated by the centre. However, in 1987, the locomotive was written off after having sustained fire damage. Therefore, a replacement in the form of 97204 was converted. This later returned to normal traffic, as no. 31970. Both locomotives were painted in RTC's red/cream livery with a black bodyside band.

97205
This was former Class 31 locomotive 31163, currently based at Chinnor & Princes Risborough Railway in Derby RTC livery.

97250–97252
Three former Class 25 locomotives were converted for use as mobile generators to provide electric heating on trains where the hauling locomotive could not supply this, including the Caledonian Sleeper. They were referred to as ETHEL units (Electric Train Heating Ex-Locomotives), and unofficially named Ethel 1, Ethel 2 and Ethel 3. They were painted in a blue/grey livery in an effort to match the coaching stock livery of the day, but this was not too successful. All three have since been scrapped.

97301–97304

These locomotives have been refurbished from Class 37 locomotives at Barrow Hill Roundhouse by Network Rail and have been fitted with ERTMS signalling equipment. They are intended for use primarily on the Cambrian lines from Shrewsbury to Aberystwyth and Pwllheli, which requires an ERTMS-capable fleet. The locomotives were formerly 37100, 37170, 37178 and 37217 respectively. A new inspection shed was built in 2008 at Coleham (Sutton Bridge Junction) in Shrewsbury for these locos.

On 2 September 2009, one of the locomotives (97303) hit a car on an unmanned level crossing near Penrhyndeudraeth, killing the car's driver.

97401–97402
97401 was a Class 46 'Peak' locomotive, bought by the Derby-based Railway Technical Centre straight from British Rail service in 1984. This locomotive did not receive its allocated departmental number and retained its original number of 46009. It was used in a high-publicity test, to prove the safety of rail transported nuclear flasks. Whilst the locomotive was written off, the flask was undamaged.

A second locomotive, no. 46023, was allocated the departmental number 97402.

97403–97404

These two locomotives were converted from Class 46 locomotives (97403 was 46035 and 97404 was 46045). They were operated by the Railway Technical Centre at Derby. 97403 was named "Ixion", and was used to evaluate wheelslip. It was painted in RTC's red/blue livery. 97404 was used as a source of spare parts. Both locomotives have been preserved.

97405–97408

These four locomotives were renumbered from Class 40 locomotives, which had all recently been withdrawn from normal traffic. A major scheme was in progress to remodel the railways around Crewe railway station. After these duties finished, the four Class 40s continued in departmental service working ballast, freight and occasional parcels trains until finally being withdrawn in 1986/87. However, three of the four were later preserved.
97405 – Formerly 40060, the final Class 40 in departmental service and withdrawn in March 1987, unofficially named Ancient Mariner, this locomotive was cut up at Vic Berry in March 1988.  
97406 – Formerly 40135, later preserved at the East Lancashire Railway.
97407 – Formerly 40012 Aureol, later preserved at the Midland Railway – Butterley.
97408 – Formerly 40118, later preserved at Tyseley Locomotive Works.

97409–97413
These five locomotives were renumbered from Class 45 'Peak' locomotives. They were used on infrastructure trains in association with major engineering works. All five locomotives were withdrawn by 1988, and have all since been scrapped.

97472, 97480, 97545 and 97561

These four locomotives were converted from Class 47 locomotives in 1989, and were used to haul test-trains throughout the country. Number 97561 was repainted in maroon livery and named "Midland Counties Railway" to commemorate the railway's 150th anniversary.

Three of the four locomotives were later renumbered into the range 47971–973, but continued to be employed hauling test-trains. They were later joined by 47974–976 and 47981. The fourth locomotive, no. 97472, was renumbered back to number 47472, and shortly after was withdrawn from traffic due to fire damage.

97650–97654

These shunting locomotives were purpose-built by Ruston & Hornsby at Lincoln in 1953 (97650) or 1959 (rest).

97701–97710
These battery locomotives were converted from the driving motor cars from former Class 501 electric multiple units, and usually worked in pairs. They were modified by the removal of the seats, sealing of the doors and windows, and flattening of the roof. The locomotives were able to work on third rail and by battery. They were powered by large batteries containing 160 cells, to work four  traction motors. Two were based at Birkenhead North TMD and were employed around Birkenhead on the Merseyrail system (97701-702). Others worked around North London and Glasgow.

97800–97807
This number range was reserved for shunting locomotives converted from capital stock. Individual locomotives are described below.
 97800 – This locomotive was converted from a Class 08 locomotive 08600 in 1979 for use as a shunter at Slade Green Depot. It was named Ivor, and was later painted in Network SouthEast livery. In 1990, this locomotive was returned to capital stock with its original number.
 97801 – This locomotive was converted from a Class 08 locomotive in 1978 for use by the Research Department at Derby. It was originally numbered RDB 968020, but was given a Class 97 number in 1979. It was named 'Pluto', used to evaluate a remote control system and withdrawn in 1981.
 97802 –  This locomotive was converted from a Class 08 locomotive in 1979 for use at Polmadie depot. It was used for only a year in this role before withdrawal.
 97803 – This locomotive was converted from British Rail's last remaining Class 05 locomotive, no. 05001. It was used on the Isle of Wight railway system, based at Ryde, and was rebuilt with a lower cab to allow it to be used through the restricted-height Ryde Tunnel. It was withdrawn as non-standard, and was replaced by no. 97805.
 97804 – This locomotive was used at Reading Signal Works following the withdrawal of 97020, and was converted from a Class 06 locomotive, no. 06003. It was made redundant when the works closed in 1984, and was later preserved. It is now the sole-surviving Class 06 locomotive.
 97805 – This locomotive was converted from a Class 03 locomotive to replace the non-standard 97803. It was later renumbered back to its original number of 03079, and remained in use on the Isle of Wight until 1996.
 97806 – This locomotive was a former Class 09 locomotive, which was allocated to Sudbrook for exclusive use on the Severn Tunnel emergency train. The train has been replaced by former Class 121 diesel units, and 97806 returned to capital stock with its original number, 09017.
 97807 – This locomotive was converted from a Class 03 to assist 97805 on the Isle of Wight. It was later renumbered back to its original number of 03179, and remained in use on the Isle of Wight until 1996.

97901–97903
This number range was reserved for Battery-Electric shunters on the Tyne and Wear Metro system.

Preservation

Several Class 97 locomotives have been preserved on heritage railways.
97201 / 24061 – North Yorkshire Moors Railway
97403 / 46035 – Privately owned, based at Crewe depot.
97404 / 46045 – Midland Railway – Butterley
97406 / 40135 – East Lancashire Railway
97407 / 40012 – Midland Railway – Butterley
97408 / 40118 – Tyseley Locomotive Works
97650 – Lincolnshire Wolds Railway
97651 – Strathspey Railway
97654 – Peak Rail
97803 / 05001 – Isle of Wight Steam Railway
97804 / 06003 – Barrow Hill Engine Shed
97805 / 03079 – Derwent Valley Light Railway

Locomotive details

Notes

References

Sources

Further reading

British Rail locomotives
British Rail departmental locomotives
Rebuilt locomotives
Standard gauge locomotives of Great Britain